The Whakatahine River is a river of the Wellington Region of New Zealand's North Island. It flows generally northwest from its source in rough hill country southeast of Masterton before turning southwest to reach the Wainuiora River.

See also
List of rivers of New Zealand

References

Rivers of the Wellington Region
Rivers of New Zealand